Ger Maguire (born 1973) is an Irish retired hurler and Gaelic footballer who play as a full-forward for the Tipperary senior teams.

Born in Cullen, County Tipperary, Maguire first arrived on the inter-county scene at the age of sixteen when he first linked up with the Tipperary minor team, before later joining the under-21 teams as a dual player as well as the junior and intermediate hurling sides. He joined the senior panels as a dual player during the 1995 championship. Maguire remained as a peripheral player on both teams for a number of seasons, winning one National Hurling League medal.

At club level Maguire is a one-time intermediate championship medallist with Lattin–Cullen.

In retirement from playing Maguire became involved in team management. He was an All-Ireland-winning selector with the Tipperary minor team in 2006, before later serving as a selector with the under-21 team.

Honours

Player

Lattin–Cullen
Tipperary Intermediate Hurling Championship (1): 1996

Tipperary
National Hurling League (1): 1999

Selector

Tipperary
All-Ireland Minor Hurling Championship (1): 2006

References

1973 births
Living people
Hurling selectors
Lattin-Cullen hurlers
Lattin-Cullen Gaelic footballers
Tipperary inter-county hurlers
Tipperary inter-county Gaelic footballers